Joana Di Carlo Conde Perez (born 21 August 1990) is a Brazilian individual trampolinist, representing her nation at international competitions. She competed at world championships, including at the 2010, 2013 and 2014 Trampoline World Championships.

References

External links
 

1990 births
Living people
Brazilian female trampolinists
Place of birth missing (living people)
21st-century Brazilian women